Kanchipuram division is a revenue division in the Kanchipuram district of Tamil Nadu, India. It comprises the taluks of Kanchipuram, Sriperumbudur and Uthiramerur.

References 

 

Kanchipuram district